Paradise is a 2006 adventure game by White Birds Productions, a company formed by Benoît Sokal, based on a novel by Sokal.

Gameplay
The game, like many classic point-and-click adventure games, is viewed from a third-person perspective and is mouse-driven, with the player clicking on locations for the main character to move to and objects to examine or pick up, among other actions.

Plot
The central protagonist of Paradise is a young woman called Ann Smith, the daughter of King Rodon, the dictator of the fictional African country of Maurania. Ann is in Europe when she hears that her father is seriously ill, but while she is en route to see him, her aircraft is shot down by rebels. She is rescued, but when she regains consciousness she cannot remember her identity or what she is doing in Africa.

Nintendo DS  and iOS versions 
On June 18, 2008 Focus Home Interactive announced that with White Birds they would be remaking the game Paradise for the Nintendo DS in Europe on November 14, 2008, as well as renaming the title Last King of Africa.

Also, an iOS version of that game was released for the United States as Episode I: Madargani on July 6, 2010, followed by Episode II: Deep Maurania on August 3, 2011.

Reception

The game received "mixed" reviews on all platforms according to video game review aggregator Metacritic.

References

External links

2006 video games
Adventure games
IOS games
Nintendo DS games
Point-and-click adventure games
Video games developed in France
Video games featuring female protagonists
Video games set in Africa
Windows games